The Rough Guide to Scottish Music is a world music compilation album originally released in 1996. The third release of the World Music Network Rough Guides series, it cuts through a broad swathe of Scottish music, focusing largely on roots revival. The compilation was produced by Phil Stanton, co-founder of the World Music Network.

Adam Greenberg of AllMusic gave the album three stars, and stated that while the album lacked the absolute newest forms of Celtic music, it was still "a fine introduction into contemporary Scottish music, keeping an eye on its influences from traditional forms." Michaelangelo Matos, writing for the Chicago Reader, wrote that while Scottish music is "generally too sentimental for my blood", the compilers deserve a nod for including Scottish techno.

Track listing

References 

1996 compilation albums
World Music Network Rough Guide albums